"The Three Sisters" is a television play episode of the BBC One anthology television series Play of the Month based on the 1901 play of the same name by Anton Chekhov. It features Eileen Atkins, Janet Suzman and Anthony Hopkins, This version was directed by Cedric Messina.

Cast
 Eileen Atkins as Olga 
 Janet Suzman as Masha 
 Michele Dotrice as Irina 
 Anthony Hopkins as Andrei

See also 
 Three Sisters (1970 film), another British version from 1970
 Three Sisters (1994 film), a Russian 1994 version originally titled Tri sestry

References

External links 
 
 Play of the Month: The Three Sisters (1970) - clip of Anthony Hopkins as Andrei from this version

1970 television plays
1970 British television episodes
Play of the Month
Filmed stage productions